Mario-Jason Kikonda (born 20 April 1996) is a French professional footballer who plays as a midfielder for  club Paris 13 Atletico.

Club career
On 28 August 2019, Kikonda signed his first professional contract with Paris FC. He made his professional debut with Paris FC in a 3–0 Ligue 2 loss to Chambly on 2 September 2019.

On 30 August 2021, he joined Dunkerque on a contract for one season with an option for a second.

Personal life
Born in France, Kikonda is of Congolese (Kinshasa) descent.

References

External links
 
 

1996 births
Black French sportspeople
French sportspeople of Democratic Republic of the Congo descent
Footballers from Le Mans
Living people
French footballers
Association football midfielders
Paris FC players
Vannes OC players
USL Dunkerque players
Paris 13 Atletico players
Ligue 2 players
Championnat National players
Championnat National 2 players
Championnat National 3 players